Vampire Hunter D: American Wasteland is a comic book mini-series based on the popular Vampire Hunter D franchise, set to be published by Devil's Due Publishing. The series was announced in July 2008, but was confirmed to be cancelled at the 2009 Long Beach Comic Con, as a result of creative differences between Devil's Due and the license holders. The story would have followed the typical Vampire Hunter D set-up and remained true to the mythos, but with a "noticeably North American feel." It was to be written by Jimmy Palmiotti.

Story
The plot of American Wasteland was for the first time to see the titular Vampire Hunter D arrive on the shores of America, a land where the vampiric Nobility persists, uninterrupted by those who seek to destroy them. There, D would have embarked on a journey inland while bringing their menace to an end.

References

External links
Official Vampire Hunter D website 
Official Vampire Hunter D blog
Devil's Due Publishing

Comics based on fiction
Devil's Due Productions vampires
Vampire Hunter D
Unpublished comics